Canada competed at the 1928 Winter Olympics in St. Moritz, Switzerland. Canada has competed at every Winter Olympic Games.

The Canadian Olympic Committee appointed W. A. Hewitt as head of mission for Canada at the 1928 Winter Olympics. He oversaw travel arrangements for the delegation which included figure skating, speed skating, skiing, and ice hockey. Hewitt and the Canadian delegation totalled 47 people, and sailed from Halifax aboard SS Arabic to Cherbourg, then travelled to St. Moritz. Hewitt and the delegation then returned to Canada aboard SS Celtic.

Medalists

Cross-country skiing

Men

Figure skating

Men

Women

Pairs

Ice hockey

The University of Toronto Graduates as the 1927 Allan Cup champions were chosen to represent Canada in ice hockey, and Hewitt oversaw the team's finances at the Olympics. Conn Smythe coached the team during the OHA season, but refused to go to the Olympics due to disagreements on which players were added to the team by the Canadian Olympic Committee. The Graduates went without Smythe, led by team captain Red Porter.

Hewitt was opposed to the format of the hockey tournament at the Olympics, which saw the Canadian team receive a bye into the second round. He wanted the team to have more games, rather than be idle for a week. Despite the wait to play, the Graduates won all three games by scoring 38 goals and conceding none, to win the gold medal.

Medal round
The top teams from each of the three groups, plus Canada, which had received a bye into the medal round, played a 3 game round-robin to determine the medal winners.

Top scorer

Nordic combined 

Events:
 18 km cross-country skiing
 normal hill ski jumping

The cross-country skiing part of this event was combined with the main medal event of cross-country skiing. Those results can be found above in this article in the cross-country skiing section. Some athletes (but not all) entered in both the cross-country skiing and Nordic combined event, their time on the 18 km was used for both events. One would expect that athletes competing at the Nordic combined event, would participate in the cross-country skiing event as well, as they would have the opportunity to win more than one medal. This was not always the case due to the maximum number of athletes that could represent a country per event.

The ski jumping (normal hill) event was held separate from the main medal event of ski jumping, results can be found in the table below.

Ski jumping

Speed skating

Men

References

Sources

 
 
 
 Olympic Winter Games 1928, full results by sports-reference.com

Nations at the 1928 Winter Olympics
1928
Olympics, Winter